Liesbet Dreesen (born 7 November 1976) is a retired Belgian freestyle swimmer. She won a bronze medal in the  freestyle relay at the 2000 European Aquatics Championships and participated in the 2000 Summer Olympics in two events, but did not reach the finals.

Between 1996 and 2000, Dreesen won four national titles in the 50 m freestyle, and also competed in open water swimming. In 2000, she set a national records in the 50 m freestyle that stood until 2007. She retired from competitions in February 2001 to work as sportsteacher.

References

1976 births
Living people
Olympic swimmers of Belgium
Swimmers at the 2000 Summer Olympics
Belgian female freestyle swimmers
European Aquatics Championships medalists in swimming
People from Uccle
Sportspeople from Brussels